Sveta Marija na Krasu (It. Madonna del Carso) is a village in Umag municipality in Istria County, Croatia.

References

Populated places in Istria County